The 2008 2. divisjon season was the third highest association football league for men in Norway.

26 games were played in 4 groups, with 3 points given for wins and 1 for draws. Mjøndalen, Skeid, Stavanger and Tromsdalen were promoted to the First Division. Number twelve, thirteen and fourteen were relegated to the 3. divisjon, except for the two number twelve teams with the most points. The winning teams from each of the 24 groups in the 3. divisjon each faced a winning team from another group in a playoff match, resulting in 12 playoff winners which were promoted to the 2. divisjon.

League tables

Group 1

Group 2

Group 3

Group 4

Top goalscorers
 27 goals:
  Armin Sistek, Asker
  Eirik Soltvedt, Ull/Kisa
 22 goals:
  Kim Nysted, Skeid
 20 goals:
  Mato Grubisic, Skjetten
 19 goals:
  Kim Larsen, Tønsberg
  Stian Nikodemussen, Tønsberg
  Petar Rnkovic, Randaberg
  Jarle Wee, Vard
 17 goals:
  Eirik Lamøy, Tromsdalen
  Kim Rune Hellesund, Nest-Sotra
  Mostafa Abdellaoue, Skeid

Promotion playoff

References
Tables: Group 1, Group 2, Group 3, Group 4
Goalscorers

Norwegian Second Division seasons
3
Norway
Norway